Amanda is a collaborative studio album by Brazilian jazz artist Eliane Elias and trumpeter Randy Brecker, her then husband. The record was released in 1985 via the Passport Jazz label.  The album is dedicated to their daughter, Amanda Elias Brecker. Shortly thereafter her solo career began, resulting in over twenty albums to date.

Reception 
Scott Yanow of Allmusic gave the album a negative review, stating "Considering the talents of trumpeter Randy Brecker and his wife, pianist Eliane Elias, one would expect their 1985 collaboration to be quite worthwhile. However this out-of-print LP is a disappointment for they perform generally weak material, emphasize electronics and utilize rather dull rhythms."

Track listing

Personnel 
 Eliane Elias – piano, vocals, flute, arrangements, compositions, keyboards of all kinds
 Randy Brecker – trumpet, electric trumpet, arrangements
 Michael Brecker – tenor saxophone
 Dave Weckl – drums
 Danny Gottlieb – drums
 Manolo Badrena – percussion
 Mark Egan, Will Lee – bass
 Jeff Mironov, Barry Finnerty – guitar
 Sadao Watanabe – alto saxophone
 Cyro Baptista – percussion

'Production
 Paul D'Innocenzo - cover photography

Chart performance
Amanda peaked at #1 Radio & Records on the Contemporary Jazz chart.

References

External links 

1985 debut albums
Randy Brecker albums
Eliane Elias albums
Collaborative albums